Mineral Point is the name of places in the United States.

Mineral Point, Missouri, a village
Mineral Point, Pennsylvania, an unincorporated community
Mineral Point, Wisconsin, a city
Mineral Point (town), Wisconsin, a town
Mineral Point, Green County, Wisconsin, an unincorporated community